is a Japanese manga series written and illustrated by Makoto Raiku. The series follows a human baby abandoned by his mother who ends up in a world inhabited solely by animals and is raised by a tanuki (Japanese raccoon dog). It was originally serialized in Kodansha's Bessatsu Shōnen Magazine from October 2009 to February 2014. Later, it was compiled into fourteen collected tankōbon volumes by Kodansha in Japan. These volumes were licensed in North America by Kodansha USA and published from August 2011 to October 2018.

Raiku chose the animal world as the main theme of the series because he wanted a topic that had never been attempted before in a shōnen manga. The animals are used as a metaphor to explore human themes, and because of the subjects it deals with it has been described as "darker" than it apparently was. This, however, did not prevent it from being well received by critics and winning the Kodansha Manga Award for Best Children's Manga. It has also sold reasonably, appearing in weekly top ten lists of best-selling manga both in Japan and North America.

Plot
A tanuki (Japanese raccoon dog) called  has her parents killed by lynxes; she feels lonely as she is the only tanuki without a family. In a world inhabited only by animals, the human baby is a mystery; he can speak with all animal species even when the different species cannot communicate between them. This ability makes him able to save , a lynx who questions the world's concept of "law of the jungle". He injures himself while trying to protect the tanuki and vows to protect Taroza thenceforth. Seven years later, Taroza has reunited many other animal species and constructed a village, where he lives with them.

In his quest to make all animals live in peace, Taroza discovers the existence of the "Eternity Fruit" that can be eaten by carnivore and herbivore. He had the same desire Taroza has and found the Eternity Fruit and the ability to speak are the solutions. For this purpose, he created a machine to make all animals understand others cries, and brought Taroza, Capri, Jyu, Giller, and Riemu from their times to the present.

Production and themes
Makoto Raiku declared he wanted to write a history that was never seen in a shōnen manga magazine before. The first character Raiku created was Monoko, having initially envisioned her raising a baby in the human world, which he changed after talking with his editor. The fact the human baby can understand the cries of all animal species was described as "kind of like a powered-up version of the human ability of 'speech'." Raiku went to Maasai Mara National Reserve, Kenya to do research, and although needed to look at photographs of animals as he found them difficult to draw, the animals allowed him to make comical chapters even if he was dealing with "difficult themes."

Reviewers have discussed on its theme and content compared to its target audience. Silverman said Raiku uses the animals as a metaphor to humans while "handling of the darker side of societies." Silverman deemed it as "darker than it at first appears", compared it to The Fox and the Hound and pondered, "It is, at its heart, a tale of love and friendship and how together we are stronger than apart. But it is also a story of child-abandonment, the cruelties of nature, and the violence of the natural world." Katherine Dacey of School Library Journal cited its humor and art as "better suited" to tweens, while cited its "darker material", and compared Monoko's parents death to that of mother of Babar, a character by Jean de Brunhoff. Scott Green of Ain't It Cool News asserted that "There are plenty of bits here that are more Werner Herzog than Walt Disney" and that "It seems like it's for young kids, but it doesn't seem appropriate for them." Mark Thomas of The Fandom Post said it feels "a bit juvenile, both in story and in humor, but there are themes present that seem to be for an older crowd" and "scenes that [...] a lot of kids would struggle to understand".

Release
Animal Land, written and illustrated by Makoto Raiku, was first published in Kodansha's Weekly Shōnen Magazine on September 9, 2009 as a one-shot titled "Episode 0". It served as a prologue to the regular serialization that was done in Bessatsu Shōnen Magazine from October 9, 2009 to February 9, 2014. Kodansha compiled its chapters into fourteen tankōbon (collected volumes) and released them from March 17, 2010 to March 7, 2014. Additionally, 28 authors wrote a yonkoma version of Animal Land for Bessatsu Shōnen Magazines six-month anniversary, and two one-shots were also published in Weekly Shōnen Magazine on March 17, and August 18, 2010.

In December 2010, Kodansha USA announced it had licensed the series for an English-language translation for the Northern America. Its first volume was released on August 16, 2011, while the last volume was published on October 30, 2018. Seven days before the release of its final print volume, Kodansha with ComiXology also made digital volumes available until October 29, 2018. The manga has also been licensed in some countries such as in France by Ki-oon and in Taiwan by Tong Li Publishing.

Volume list

Reception
The Young Adult Library Services Association, a division of American Library Association, included Animal Land on the 2012 list of "Great Graphic Novels for Teens". In 2013, Animal Land won the 37th Kodansha Manga Award in the category of Best Children's Manga. In addition, volume 8 entered the top 30 in weekly list of Oricon's best-selling manga, while volumes 10, 11, 13 and 14 were among the 50 best-selling manga of a week in Japan. The third English volume was also featured in The New York Times ranking of best-selling manga at the tenth position in January 2012. By September 2013, however, Kodansha USA stated Animal Land was one of their "lesser known series".

Its premise was very praised; Rebecca Silverman of Anime News Network called it "a fascinating story that should appeal to those looking for something a little different in their manga diet," while David Welsh of Manga Bookshelf complimented its "clever plot". Its "absurdist comedy" was highlighted by Chris Kirby of The Fandom Post; on the contrary, Ash Brown of Experiments in Manga felt its "focus on scatological humor" out-of-place. Mark Thomas of The Fandom Post praised its "somewhat interesting premise" but said it is hindered by a confusion on "what it wants to be", changing abruptly from drama to comedy—both of them were described as "flat" by him. 

Kirby praised the art: "The style fluctuates perfectly between super cartoony and silly to more real characters with beautiful scenery." Brown said, "The artwork in Animal Land is a little strange—a combination of realism and anthropomorphism—but generally engaging." Silverman qualified it as "a mixed bag"; she commended the "lush" background artwork, while affirmed the tanuki look like humans dressed as animals, which is "difficult to accept."

Silverman criticized some "discrepancies", including the human features in the tanuki, Monoko's uncertain size and age, as well as the fact that Kurokagi wears clothes. Welsh commented on the anthropomorphic features in the animals, deeming it "creepy", also criticizing its "shrillness" because of the "hyperactive characters". In opposition, Kirby, comparing the tanuki's faces to the Excel Sagas Puchuu aliens, stated it has "plenty comedic value on their own." Kirby deemed the characters "interesting", and the world "fantastically different." Brown also praised the characters, especially Taroza, whose growth he appreciated to accompany. Scott Green of Ain't It Cool News commented that "It's a unique formula that that isn't quite convincing in its infant stage, but which becomes more attention commanding as it matures".

Notes and references

Notes

References

External links
 

2009 manga
Comedy anime and manga
Comics about animals
Dystopian anime and manga
Fantasy anime and manga
Kodansha manga
Shōnen manga